Triomma is a genus of flowering plants belonging to the family Burseraceae.

Its native range is Western Malesia.

Species:
 Triomma malaccensis Hook.f.

References

Burseraceae
Burseraceae genera